The Constable and Governor of Windsor Castle is in charge of Windsor Castle in England on behalf of the sovereign. The day-to-day operations are under the Superintendent, who is an officer of the Master of the Household's Department of the Royal Household.

The Constable receives no salary, but has a residence in the Castle. From 1833-1957, the office was mostly filled by a member of the Royal Family, but now it is held by a senior retired officer of the armed forces of the Crown. He is the representative of the Lord Chamberlain within the Castle. The Constable also has nominal charge of its garrison, including the Windsor Castle Guard of the Foot Guards of the Household Division, as well as of the Military Knights of Windsor. The posts of Constable and Governor have been joined since 1660. A special uniform is prescribed for the Constable and Governor (similar to the full dress uniform of a General officer, but with scarlet collar and cuffs on a blue tunic rather than vice versa); alternatively (and more often than not) service uniform may be worn.

There was a Deputy Constable and Lieutenant-Governor from 1833 to 1989. From 1964, he was also Governor of the Military Knights of Windsor until the office was abolished in 1989. At one time there was also a separate Constable of the Round Tower. From 1928 to 1935 this was held jointly with the post of Deputy Constable.

The following is a list, as complete as can be compiled from sources at present available, of the castellans, keepers and constables of Windsor Castle:

List of Constables and Governors of Windsor Castle

List of Deputy Constables and Lieutenant-Governors of Windsor Castle 
Please note this list is incomplete.

References 

Windsor Castle
Windsor Castle